Maksyuta or Maksiuta is an East Slavic surname that may refer to
Anatoliy Maksyuta (born 1963), Ukrainian politician
 Nikolay Maksyuta (1947–2021), Russian politician
 Valeria Maksyuta (born 1987), Ukrainian-Israeli artistic gymnast 
Victoria Maksyuta (born 1981), Ukrainian figure skater

See also
 

Russian-language surnames
Ukrainian-language surnames